Mezilaurus is a genus of plant in the family Lauraceae. It is a neotropical genus consisting of 18-27 species, mostly hardwood evergreen trees, occurring from Costa Rica to the southeast of Brazil (Werff 1987). 13 species have been identified in Brazil, distributed mostly in the Amazon region. In  Rio de Janeiro state only M. navalium (Allemão) Taub. ex Mez has been recorded. Some species have been reported within the Cerrado and in semideciduous forest surrounding the Pantanal Matogrossense. The name Mezilaurus (half laurel) refers to its similar appearance to the genus Laurus.

The genus was described by Otto Kuntze ex Paul Hermann Wilhelm Taubert and published in Centralblatt Botanischer 50: 21 in 1892. The type species is Mezilaurus navalium (Allemão) Taub. Ex Mez.
This genus is closely related to Licaria and Aiouea.

Mezilaurus are monoecious trees or shrubs with leaves alternate, usually congested at the apex of the branches, without papillae on the abaxial epidermis. The inflorescences are panicles with racemose terminations. The flowers are bisexual, with a hypanthium that is narrows at the top, uncompressed below the tepals, 6 tepals are usually erect and equal, the inner surface without papillae. There are three fertile stamens. Stamens of the third whorl are fertile. The fruit is black, sometimes domed. The cupula when present with pateliforme summit, small in relation to the fruit, the tepals are deciduous.

The fruit is a berry-like drupe. Seed dispersal is mostly by birds, though monkeys, porcupines and squirrels have also been observed eating the fruits.

This genus has some species of high commercial value, with few or no chemical or biological studies.

Accepted species 
23 species are accepted:
Mezilaurus caatingae 
Mezilaurus campaucola van der Werff
Mezilaurus crassiramea (Meisn.) Taub. ex Mez
Mezilaurus decurrens (Ducke) Kosterm.
Mezilaurus duckei van der Werff
Mezilaurus glabriantha F.M.Alves & V.C.Souza
Mezilaurus introrsa F.M.Alves & van der Werff
Mezilaurus ita-uba (Meissner) Taubert ex Mez
Mezilaurus lindaviana Schwacke & Mez
Mezilaurus manausensis van der Werff
Mezilaurus micrantha van der Werff
Mezilaurus microphylla F.M.Alves & V.C.Souza
Mezilaurus navalium (Fr. Allem.) Taub.
Mezilaurus opaca Kubitzki & van der Werff
Mezilaurus palcazuensis van der Werff
Mezilaurus pyriflora van der Werff
Mezilaurus revolutifolia F.M.Alves & P.L.R.Moraes
Mezilaurus sessiliflora P.L.R.Moraes & M.C.Vergne
Mezilaurus sprucei (Meisn.) Taub. ex Mez
Mezilaurus subcordata (Ducke) Kosterm.
Mezilaurus synandra (Mez) Kosterm.
Mezilaurus triunca van der Werff
Mezilaurus vanderwerffii F.M.Alves & Baitello

References 

Lauraceae genera
Taxonomy articles created by Polbot
Neotropical realm flora
Lauraceae